Copa Constitució 2006 is the fourteenth season of Andorra's football knockout tournament. The competition started on 22 January 2006 with the first round games and ended on 13 May 2006 with the Final. The defending champions are FC Santa Coloma.

Results

First round
The matches were played on 22 January 2006.

|}

Second round
The matches were played on 5 February 2006.

|}

Quarterfinals
The ties were played on 7 May 2006.

|}

 The tie was awarded 0-3 to FC Santa Coloma as UE Extremenya only turned up with 7 players.

Semifinals
The ties were played on 10 May 2006.

|}

Final

References
 Copa Constitució on rsssf.com

External links
 Copa Constitució on rsssf.com

Copa Constitució seasons
Andorra
Copa